The Pakistani cricket team toured Sri Lanka from 1 June to 12 July 2012. The tour consists of two Twenty20 Internationals (T20Is), five One Day Internationals (ODIs) and three Test matches.

Squads

Notes

T20I series

1st T20I

2nd T20I

ODI series

1st ODI

2nd ODI

3rd ODI

4th ODI

5th ODI

Test series

1st Test

2nd Test

3rd Test

References

External links 
 
 

2012 in Pakistani cricket
2012 in Sri Lankan cricket
2012
International cricket competitions in 2012
Sri Lankan cricket seasons from 2000–01